Francis Harold "Frank" Hawkins (1 June 1897 – 20 December 1971) was an Australian politician. He was a member of the New South Wales Parliament from 1935 until 1968 and held a number of ministerial positions in the Government of New South Wales. He was a member of the Labor Party.

Early life and career
Hawkins was born in Tenterfield and was educated to intermediate level at De La Salle College, Armidale. He worked initially with the Postmaster General's department and then the NSW Department of Railways. He was transferred to Newcastle Railway Station in 1933.

He died in Newcastle in 1971 at the age of 74, and was buried at Sandgate Cemetery following a service at Sacred Heart Cathedral, Hamilton.

Political career
He successfully contested the Legislative Assembly seat of Newcastle as the Lang Labor candidate in the 1935 general election. The previous member, Peter Connolly did not contest the seat after losing his party's pre-selection.

Hawkins held ministerial roles in the New South Wales Labor Governments of premiers; James McGirr, Joseph Cahill, Bob Heffron and Jack Renshaw. He was a minister without portfolio from 1950 until 1952, Secretary for Lands from 1952 until 1956 and Minister for Child Welfare and Social Welfare from 1956 until the defeat of the Renshaw government at the 1 May 1965 general election.

References

 

1897 births
1971 deaths
Members of the New South Wales Legislative Assembly
Australian Labor Party members of the Parliament of New South Wales
20th-century Australian politicians
Public servants of New South Wales